The Ambassador of the United Kingdom to Latvia is the United Kingdom's foremost diplomatic representative in Latvia, and head of the UK's diplomatic mission in Riga.

Heads of Mission

Envoy Extraordinary and Minister Plenipotentiary
From 1921 to 1940, British Ministers were accredited to Estonia and Lithuania as well as Latvia; they were based in Riga.

1921–1922: Ernest Wilton
1922–1927: Sir Tudor Vaughan
1928–1930: Joseph Addison
1931–1934: Hughe Knatchbull-Hugessen
1934–1937: Sir Edmund Monson, 3rd Baronet
1937–1940: Sir Charles Orde

No representation 1940–91. Latvia was incorporated into the Soviet Union in 1940, and regained its independence in 1991.

Ambassador
1991–1993: Richard Samuel
1993–1995: Richard Ralph
1996–1999: Nicholas Jarrold
1999–2002: Stephen Nash
2002–2005: Andrew Tesoriere
2005–2007: Ian Bond
2007–2009: Richard Moon
2010–2013: Andrew Soper
2013–2017: Sarah Cowley
2017–2021: Keith Shannon

2021–present Paul Brummell

References

External links
UK and Latvia

Latvia
 
United Kingdom Ambassadors